Jezdkovice is a municipality and village in Opava District in the Moravian-Silesian Region of the Czech Republic. It has about 200 inhabitants.

History
The first written mention of Jezdkovice is from 1250. The village was founded after 1220.

References

External links

Villages in Opava District